Spetisbury is a village and civil parish in north Dorset, England, situated on the River Stour and the A350 road,  southeast of Blandford Forum. In the 2011 census the civil parish had 224 households and a population of 555.

Spetisbury village is a linear settlement, with mostly only one line of buildings adjacent to the A350 road. Dorset County Council has included the A350 in its response to the Major Roads Network (MRN) consultation, leading to anticipation of an A350 Spetisbury & Charlton Marshall bypass.

Spetisbury is twinned with Le Vast, a village in the north-east of the Cotentin Peninsula in Normandy, France.

History and buildings

Spetisbury is home to the Iron Age fortifications known as Spetisbury Rings or Crawford Castle (but not related to Crawford Castle in Scotland), destroyed by Roman advances in the first century A.D.

The earthworks, known as Spetisbury Rings, were a stronghold before the Romans came, and Roman and Briton lie side by side in graves.  Spetisbury Rings is the third in a series of Iron Age earthworks, starting from Hambledon Hill, and also including Hod Hill, Spetisbury Rings, Buzbury Rings, Badbury Rings and Dudsbury Camp. The Iron Age port at Hengistbury Head forms a final Iron Age monument in this small chain of sites.

The recent history of the village originates from the 18th-century St Monica's Priory, which was at first a country house and then from about 1800 a home for several different religious orders. Although most of the original building was destroyed, some still remains and forms part of the village hall. Another important building is Spetisbury Manor. The building, many years previously the home of the local squire, is now a large retirement home.

The centre of the linear settlement is crossed by the B3075, which traverses the Stour at Crawford Bridge, one of the river's most famous arch bridges. Built in the 15th century, it has nine arches. Other notable transport structures include a disused railway station on the former Somerset and Dorset Joint Railway. Spetisbury station was one of four stations on the Dorset section of the line closed as an economy measure in 1956; the whole railway closed in 1966 as part of the Beeching Axe.

Parish church

The local church of St John the Baptist dates from the late 15th century with several important architectural features, most notably the original tower. The church has been built with a mixture of building stones including carstone, greensand, limestone and chiefly with much knapped flint in the Victorian nave and chancel. It has a fairly squat 15th-century tower (with six bells), but the rest of the fabric is mostly 19th century, restored by Thomas Henry Wyatt in 1859. The pulpit is Elizabethan, and there is an early 17th-century monument to John Bowyer, who died in 1599. In the churchyard, close to the porch, is a gravestone in the form of a three-sided pyramid; a tetrahedron.

Sources
John Hutchins, The History and Antiquities of the County of Dorset, 3rd ed., edited by William Shipp and James Whitworth Hodson, Westminster: J.B. Nichols and Sons, 1861-1873.
John Newman and Nikolaus Pevsner, The Buildings of England: Dorset. Harmondsworth: Penguin, 1972, pp. 394–395

References

External links

The Parish Council
The Local First School Spetisbury School founded 1733
A350 Plans
Spetisbury Rings

Villages in Dorset